is a sub-kilometer asteroid, classified as near-Earth object and potentially hazardous asteroid of the Apollo group, which was listed on the Sentry Risk Table in January 2008 with a Torino Scale rating of 1. The asteroid showed a 1 in 71,000 chance of impact on 9 January 2089. It was briefly downgraded to Torino Scale 0 in February 2008, but still showed a cumulative 1 in 53,000 chance of an impact. In March it was back at Torino Scale 1 with a 1 in 28,000 chance of impact on 9 January 2089. By mid April 2008, it was back to Torino Scale 0. It was removed from the Sentry Risk Table on 19 December 2009.

2183 passage 
But the nominal solution shows the asteroid passing  from Earth.

References

External links 
 
 
 

332446
332446
332446
332446
20080110